This is a list of all the yachts built by Palmer Johnson, sorted by year.



Table
{| class="wikitable sortable"
|- style="vertical-align:top"
! rowspan="2" | Year
! colspan="2" | Size
! colspan="2" | Name
! rowspan="2" | Picture
! rowspan="2" | Reference
|-
! Length
! Volume
! Original
! Current 

|- style="background:#9fc;"
| 1967
| 
| 
| colspan="2" align=center | White Eagle
| 
| 
|- style="background:Cyan"
| 1967
| 
| 
| colspan="2" align=center | Firebird
| 
| 
|- 
| 1974
| 
| | 
| colspan="2" align=center | Tempest
| 
| 
|- style="background:Pink"
| 1974
| 
| 
| colspan="2" align=center | Kialoa III
| 
| 
|- style="background:Cyan"
| 1975
| 
| 
| colspan="2" align=center | Aria
| 
| 
|- style="background:#9fc;"
| 1977
| 
| 
| colspan="2" align=center | Caribana
| 
| 
|- style="background:cyan"
| 1979
| 
| 
| colspan="2" align=center | Fortuna
| 
| 
|- style="background:#9fc;"
| 1980
| 
| 
| Lovesong
| Banyan
| 
| 
|- style="background:Cyan"
| 1983
| 
| 
| Magic Lady
| Toto
| 
| 
|- style="background:#9fc;"
| 1983
| 
| 
| colspan="2" align=center | Arabella
| 
| 
|- 
| 1984
| 
| 
| Tina E
| Captivator
| 
| 
|- 
| 1984
| 
| 
| colspan="2" align=center | Sirocco
| 
| 
|-
| 1985
| 
| 
| Pegasus II
| Sunday Morning
| 
| 
|- style="background:Pink"
| 1987
| 
| 
| colspan="2" align=center | Time
| 
| 
|- 
| 1988
| 
| 
| colspan="2" align=center | Force of Habit
| 
| 
|-
| 1989
| 
| 
| colspan="2" align=center | Galileo
| 
| 
|-
| 1990
| 
| 
| Maysylph
| Axia
| 
| 
|-
| 1990
| 
| 
| Astral
| Sirma III
| 
| 
|- 
| 1990
| 
| 
| Audacious
| Volterra
| 
| 
|-
| 1991
| 
| 
| Mandalay
| Kaori
| 
| 
|-
| 1992
| 
| 
| Timoneer
| Knickerbocker
| 
| 
|-
| 1992
| 
| 
| Shanakee
| Dance Smartly
| 
| 
|- 
| 1992
| 
| 
| Isis
| Myu
| 
| 
|- 
| 1993
| 
| 
| Clueless
| Zooom
| 
| 
|- style="background:Pink"
| 1994
| 
| 
| Lady Jenn
| Grand Illusion
| 
| 
|- style="background:Pink"
| 1994
| 
| 
| La Baroness
| Amorazur II
| 
| 
|-
| 1995
| 
| 
| Nazenin III
| Keewaydin
| 
| 
|-
| 1995
| 
| 
| Nazenin III
| Keewaydin
| 
| 
|- style="background:Pink"
| 1996
| 
| 
| Turmoil
| Pioneer
| 
| 
|-
| 1997
| 
| 
| Paraffin
| Lady J
| 
| 
|-
| 1997
| 
| 
| Moon River
| Excel
| 
| 
|-
| 1998
| 
| 
| colspan="2" align=center | Our Way
| 
| 
|- style="background:#9fc;"
| 1998
| 
| 
| La Baronessa
| Pearl
| 
| 
|- 
| 1999
| 
| 
| Twisted Pair
| Fortuna
| 
| 
|- 
| 1999
| 
| 
| colspan="2" align=center | Oci Ciornie
| 
| 
|- 
| 1999
| 
| 
| Grazianna
| Nirvana
| 
| 
|-
| 2000
| 
| 
| My Weigh
| Aphrodite
| 
| 
|-
| 2000
| 
| 
| Alexis
| I Sea
| 
| 
|-
| 2000
| 
| 
| Mostro
| Strega
| 
| 
|-
| 2001
| 
| 
| Inevitable
| Rasa
| 
| 
|-
| 2002
| 
| 
| colspan="2" align=center | Arrowhead
| 
| 
|-
| 2002
| 
| 
| Anson Bell
| Helios 2
| | 
|-
| 2003
| 
| 
| Unity| 4Puppies| 
| 
|-
| 2003
| 
| 
| colspan="2" align=center | Milk and Honey| 
| 
|-
| 2003
| 
| 
| Cover Drive| Ascari| 
| 
|-
| 2004
| 
| 
| Four Whishes| Alta| 
| 
|-
| 2004
| 
| 
| Regency| Incentive| 
| 
|-
| 2005
| 
| 
| Stanley| Escape| 
| 
|-
| 2005
| 
| 
| Stanley| Temptation| 
| 
|-
| 2005
| 
| 
| Khalila| Bagheera| 
| 
|-
| 2005
| 
| 
| Khalila| Hush| 
| 
|-
| 2006
| 
| 
| Vanquish| Burn Rate| 
| 
|-
| 2006
| 
| 
| Muse| Invictus| 
| 
|-
| 2007
| 
| 
| colspan="2" align=center | Waverunner| 
| 
|-
| 2007
| 
| 
| O'Khalila| Aquanova|
| 
|-
| 2007
| 
| 
| colspan="2" align=center | Dragon| 
| 
|-
| 2007
| 
| 
| colspan="2" align=center | Hokulani| 
| 
|-
| 2008
| 
| 
| My Izumi| Izumi| 
| 
|-
| 2008
| 
| 
| colspan="2" align=center | Four Jacks| 
| 
|-
| 2008
| 
| 
| Clifford II| Equity| 
| 
|-
| 2008
| 
| 
| Ocean Drive| Blacksheep| 
| 
|-
| 2009
| 
| 
| colspan="2" align=center | Plus Too| 
| 
|-
| 2009
| 
| 
| Vitamin| Kjos| 
| 
|-
| 2009
| 
| 
| Cover drive 2| Domino| 
| 
|-
| 2009
| 
| 
| Oneness| Siren| 
| 
|-
| 2009
| 
| 
| Blue Ice| Silver Wave| 
| 
|-
| 2010
| 
| 
| Vantage| Stealth| 
| 
|-
| 2010
| 
| 
| colspan="2" align=center | DB9| 
| 
|-
| 2012
| 
| 
| Griffin| Defiant| 
| 
|- style="background:Cyan"
| 2013
| 
| 
| colspan="2" align=center | Lady M| 
| 
|-
| 2014
| 
| 
| colspan="2" align=center | Bliss| 
| 
|-
| 2014
| 
| 
| colspan="2" align=center | Khalilah| 
| 
|-
| 2016
| 
| 
| colspan="2" align=center | Sanam| 
| 
|}

Under construction

Palmer Johnson recently signed a contract to build 30 of their new PJ 48 Niniette and PJ 63 Niniette Open Sport series yachts. The Niniette's are jointly developed by Palmer Johnson and Bugatti. The contract for the 30 yachts is valued at over EUR 40,000,000. Palmer Johnson teamed up again with Bugatti to create the PJ 66 Niniette''.

See also
 List of large sailing yachts
 List of motor yachts by length
 Luxury yacht
 Sailing yacht

References

Palmer Johnson
Palmer Johnson
Palmer Johnson